Barcelona Búfals is an American football team based in Barcelona, Catalonia, Spain. Búfals was founded on 1988 and were one of the four teams to play the first league competition in Spain.

The team compete in LNFA Serie B, the second-tier division of American football in Spain.

References

External links
Official website

American football teams established in 1988
1988 establishments in Catalonia
American football teams in Catalonia